Salvador Benedicto, officially the Municipality of Don Salvador Benedicto or simply referred to as Don Salvador Benedicto (DSB), is a 4th class municipality in the province of Negros Occidental, Philippines. According to the 2020 census, it has a population of 26,922 people.

The municipality is a post-colonial provincial hill station, designated the Summer Capital of Negros Occidental, and is a popular tourist site.

History

Located at the center of the mountains of northern Negros Occidental, Don Salvador Benedicto was chartered through Batas Pambansa Bilang 336 by then President Ferdinand Marcos. It consolidated all the remote barangays of San Carlos City and the towns of Calatrava and Murcia which were apparently neglected due to inaccessibility.

The town is named after the former Vice Governor Salvador V. Benedicto (March 31, 1889–November 28, 1956) who played an important role in the setting up of a Revolutionary Government in Negros Island particularly in Barangay Igmaya-an, when the country was occupied by the Japanese during World War II. He was also the main guerrilla coordinator in both Negros Oriental and Negros Occidental during the said war. Salvador Benedicto is a relative of Roberto Benedicto, former President Marcos' crony.

Geography

Barangays
Don Salvador Benedicto is politically subdivided into 7 barangays.
 Bago (Lalung)
 Bagong Silang (Marcelo)
 Bunga
 Igmaya-an
 Kumaliskis
 Pandanon
 Pinowayan (Prosperidad)

Climate

Demographics

Major languages are Hiligaynon, followed by Cebuano with English and Filipino being used as second languages.

Economy

Although a small town, the town of Don Salvador Benedicto has seen a rise in its municipal economy thanks to tourism and local agriculture. Due to its high altitude like Baguio, the town can support crops that grow in temperate areas, making it ideal for a multitude of farming businesses. Tourism is on the rise for the town especially when travellers head out into the heart of the province. Also located in the municipality are the Choco Hills, similar to Bohol's Chocolate Hills, with shared boundary of Barangay Prosperidad, San Carlos City.

See also

Mambukal, a township hill station in Negros Occidental.
Baguio, first hill station and Summer Capital of the Philippines.

References

External links

Don Salvador Benedicto Profile at the Official Website of Negros Occidental
 [ Philippine Standard Geographic Code]
Philippine Census Information

Municipalities of Negros Occidental
Mountain resorts in the Philippines